James Albert Beard (25 July 1924 – 30 October 2017) was a New Zealand architect, town planner, and landscape architect.

Training and education 
Born in Christchurch in 1924, Beard trained in architecture at Auckland University, and was an early member of the Wellington Architectural Centre (formed in 1946). He worked for the Ministry of Works architectural office becoming a cadet supervisor in the late 1940s. He was actively involved with the Wellington Architectural Centre, particularly in the 1940s, 1950s and 1980s. After passing the Royal Town Planning Institute (London) examinations in Wellington (while working at the New Zealand Ministry of Works), he received a scholarship and went to M.I.T. to study city planning (1951–1952). Later at Harvard University he studied for a master's degree in Landscape Architecture. In the 1960s he co-founded Gabites and Beard Registered Architects and Town Planning Consultants in Wellington and played an active role in the New Zealand Institute of Architects. In the late 1960s he returned to America to work as a Research Assistant (1967–1968) at the Harvard Graduate School of Design where he worked with Peter Hornbeck and Peter Jacobs co-producing Highway Esthetics: functional criteria for planning and design (Cambridge: Harvard University Press, 1968).

Private practice 
From 1971 to 1972, Beard was part of the architectural partnership Gabites, Toomath, Beard, Wilson & partners. Following this he formed James Beard & Co. In the 1980s he was responsible for the major repair, strengthening and restoration of the Katherine Mansfield Birthplace in Thorndon, including substantial conservation research (this material and documentation is deposited at the Alexander Turnbull Library), and was extensively involved in the New Zealand Institute of Landscape Architecture.

Beard was involved in a range of buildings and landscape design. He is recognised for his residential work (especially the Beard House, Hauraki Street, Karori (1955), and apartment design in the 1960s), and two well-known inner city Wellington buildings: the Hannah Playhouse (1973) for Downstage Theatre, and P.S.I.S. Investment House (1976). He was involved in significant landscape projects (e.g. the Te Marua Lakes Project, Kaitoke Regional Park). His work was characterised as a multi-disciplinary practice, drawing on his skills in the fields of architecture, landscape architecture and town planning. He was also involved in teaching architecture at a tertiary level at Auckland University, Wellington Technical College, Wellington Polytechnic and Victoria University of Wellington.

Beard died in Wellington on 30 October 2017.

Service to the profession 
Elected a Fellow of the New Zealand Institute of Architects in 1969, Beard was closely involved in the institute at a national level, serving on the education committee (1968–1970), publications committee (1965–1969), journal committee (1963–1964) and library and journal committee (1964–1965). He was the president of the Wellington Architectural Centre (1962), a committee member (1958–1960, 1982–1986), and was honoured as a life member. His service to the design community also included involvement with the New Zealand Institute of Landscape Designers, and the New Zealand Institute of Landscape Architects, of which he was made an Honorary Fellow in 1998.

Influence and significance 
Beard was a significant New Zealand architect. In his work at the Ministry of Works he influenced a generation of architects (including people such as Bill Alington). He was one of the few New Zealand architects of his generation to undertake postgraduate study at an overseas university, studying town planning at the Massachusetts Institute of Technology, and then landscape architecture at Harvard University. He was thus one of the few qualified town planners and landscape architects working in New Zealand in the 1950s and 1960s. It was not until 1969 that Lincoln University established the Postgraduate Diploma in Landscape Architecture – the first full-time course in landscape architecture in Australasia.

Beard also made a significant contribution to concrete apartment design in Wellington in the late 1950s and early 1960s, examples of which exist in Hamilton Road, Hataitai, Tapiri Street/William Street, Hataitai, Brougham Street, Mount Victoria, and Wellington Road, Kilbirnie. These were exercises in providing both liveable modern homes and efficient planning, at a time when single unit detached dwellings were the norm. He is perhaps best known within architectural circles for his significant contribution to Wellington's inner city examples of Brutalist architecture, namely the Hannah Playhouse (1973) and PSIS Investment House (1976).

His work on the Katherine Mansfield Birthplace is also significant as a contribution to New Zealand's national cultural heritage. This work included various reports and research work. The unpublished material is held within the Alexander Turnbull Library Manuscripts Collections. Published material on this work includes: Beard, James Mansfield Precinct (Wellington [N.Z.]: New Zealand Heritage and Conservation Trust and the Wellington Heritage and Conservation Trust, [2005]). Katherine Mansfield Birthplace received a New Zealand Tourism Award in 1994.

Beard contributed to New Zealand architecture and landscape design and architecture, as well as town planning throughout his career, both as a professional and as an astute and committed commentator in institute and organisational publications such as: New Zealand Architect/Architecture New Zealand, The Landscape, Cuttings, and Off Centre. He gave service to organisations such as the Wellington Architectural Centre, the New Zealand Institute of Architects, the New Zealand Institute of Landscape Designers, and founded the Wellington Heritage and Conservation Trust as part of his efforts to lobby for a better built environment. As Michael Jones has noted, "Beard has exerted a sustained influence on late 1960s attitudes to the landscape – as a regular commentator on national and civic policy and action." (Jones "Professional recognition" p. 9.)

His work, in particular the Hannah Playhouse, is also deemed to have national significance as it is represented in the Drawings, Photographs and Manuscripts Collections at the Alexander Turnbull Library at the National Library in Wellington. In addition both the libraries at the Schools of Architecture at University of Auckland, and Victoria University hold collections of Beard's writings on Architecture, Landscape Architecture, and Town Planning. The Hannah Playhouse used by Downstage Theatre is also recognised with its inclusion in the Wellington City Council Heritage Building Inventory, and his and Al Gabites' 1965 proposed "Precinct Planning for Wellington" was exhibited in "Unbuilt Wellington," at the Wellington City Art Gallery.

Publications
 "Alternative greening of waterfront urged." Evening Post [Wellington] 3 Oct. 1989.
 "Architect claims building quake code too strict." Evening Post [Wellington] 14 May 1975.
 "Christchurch New Town Hall and Civic Centre Competition." NZIA Journal. 33.10 (1966): 292–325.
 "Concrete Block Home Has Holiday Appeal: An Architect-Designed Home Form the NZIA Wellington Branch." Post [Wellington]. 17 Apr. 1972: 23.
 "Controls on land use ignore most of things that matter." Evening Post [Wellington] 25 Aug..
 "Family House: Simple Post and Beam Construction." Home and Building. XXII.1(1959): 38–41.
 "High-rise buildings would mar Kelburn area – claim by opponents." Evening Post [Wellington] 23 May 1975.
 "How the Railways' new ferry will look at the Picton terminal." Evening Post [Wellington] Feb. 1962.
 "Increased traffic flow will mar public appeal of Wellington." Evening Post [Wellington] 11 Nov. 1972.
 "Investment House Wellington." NZIA Journal. 35.11(1968): 346–51.
 "New BNZ Glass-in Site Plan." Evening Post [Wellington]. 9 Oct. 1986: 15.
 "NZIA-Resene NZ Awards for Architecture 2006: Enduring Awards." Architecture New Zealand. 3(2006): 59.
 "Post Office Stores and Workshops Taita." NZIA Journal. 35.3(1969): 90–93.
 "PSA Building Project." PSA Journal. 60.7(1973): 10.
 "Site of Kilbirnie hotel now modern block of flats." Evening Post [Wellington] 8 Mar. 1961.
 "Study of city by architects." Otago Daily Times [Dunedin] 9 Mar. 1960.
 "Top award for planning work." Evening Post [Wellington] 9 Nov. 1991.
 "Wellington's high-rise boom following disastrous patterns, says architect." The Post [Wellington] 22 Aug. 1973.
 Beard, James Albert. The 1889 New Zealand Loan and Mercantile Building. OSSMOSIS 17. Ed. James Albert Beard. Wellington: Open Space Society, 1992.
 ---. "Anthony Treadwell." Architecture New Zealand 1 (2004): 12.
 ---. "Arboreta and ecosystems." OSSMOSIS 58 (2006): 1–5.
 ---. "At sea with the six C's." OSSMOSIS 54 (2004): 1–6.
 ---. Auckland School of Architecture Review 1986: Submission by the Architectural Centre Inc. 11 Mar. 1986. ts. Personal collection of J A Beard, Wellington.
 ---. "Balderdash and flapdoodle." Planning Quarterly 114 (1994): 3.
 ---. "A bank's stadium award." OSSMOSIS 49 (2000).
 ---. "Beauty, technology, biological process." OSSMOSIS 55 (2005): 1–4.
 ---. "Beyond the box." Architecture New Zealand July/August (2005): 74–76.
 ---. "The Bob". Jun. 1994. OSSMOSIS 25. Personal collection of J A Beard, Wellington.
 ---. "The Bobs and cycles." OSSMOSIS 27 (1994): 1–86.
 ---. "Clubs, shebangs and warrens." New Zealand Architect 5 (1985): 21–26.
 ---. Conservation. OSSMOSIS 28. Ed. James Albert Beard. Wellington: New Zealand Heritage and Conservation Trust; Wellington Heritage And Conservation Trust, 1995.
 ---. The Draft Wellington Regional Landscape Plan. OSSMOSIS 37. Ed. James Albert Beard. Wellington: New Zealand Heritage and Conservation Trust; Wellington Heritage and Conservation Trust, 1996.
 ---. "Factories in national parks." OSSMOSIS 59 (2006).
 ---. "Fundamentalist values boondockery." OSSMOSIS 53 (2004): 1–10.
 ---. "Helmut Einhorn 1911–1988." Architecture New Zealand July/August (1988): 14.
 ---. "An historical perspective." Home and Building 4 (1982): 73.
 ---. "Hollywood fantasy ignores basic norms." City Voice [Wellington] 30 Mar. 1994.
 ---, ed. Housing Competition Buller Grove: Assessors report. Lower Hutt: New Zealand Institute of Architects in association with Lower Hutt Civic Corporation, 1976.
 ---. "Human consumers, externalities, pollutions." OSSMOSIS 60 (2006): 1–4.
 ---. "Humans, humanism, humanists." OSSMOSIS 47 (1999): 1–7.
 ---. "Hunter Building Victoria University of Wellington." New Zealand Architect 2 (1978): 3.
 ---. "An interview with the Minister." The Landscape 5 (1977).
 ---. "Lambton Common." OSSMOSIS 43 (1997): 1–11.
 ---. "Mansfield Conservation Precinct." OSSMOSIS 61 (2007): 1–9.
 ---. Mansfield Precinct. OSSMOSIS 57. Ed. James Albert Beard. Wellington: New Zealand Heritage and Conservation Trust; Wellington Heritage and Conservation Trust, 2005.
 ---. "Mansfield Precinct economics." OSSMOSIS 63 (2007): 1–12.
 ---. Motupihi Village. OSSMOSIS 32. Ed. James Albert Beard. Wellington: New Zealand Heritage and Conservation Trust; Wellington Heritage And Conservation Trust, 1995.
 ---. "Mui Potu conservation 2004: the ongoing protection of the biological process of Abel Tasman Point peninsula, Wainui Estuary, Golden Bay." OSSMOSIS 52 (2003): 1–26.
 ---. "Obituary." Architecture New Zealand January/February (1988): 28.
 ---. Old BNZ Park: a park without and within a triangle... OSSMOSIS 1. Wellington: James Beard and Co, 1988.
 ---. One window houses. OSSMOSIS 23. Ed. James Albert Beard. Wellington: Wellington Heritage And Conservation Trust, 1994.
 ---. "Open city space." Dominion [Wellington] 21 Apr. 1988.
 ---. The Open Space Society green alternative to the Lambton Harbour Company proposals. OSSMOSIS 3. Wellington: James Beard and Co, 1988.
 ---. "Our Lady of the Star of the Sea." OSSMOSIS 65 (2007): 1–12.
 ---. Pedestrian Precincts for Wellington 1988. OSSMOSIS 2. Wellington: James Beard and Co, 1988.
 ---. "Planning for leisure." NZIA Journal 37.6 (1970): 188–89.
 ---. "Planning open spaces and high rise development in Wellington." NZIA Journal 36.10 (1969): 316–19.
 ---. Police Headquarters – a pretty police park for Waring Taylor Street. OSSMOSIS 13. Ed. James Albert Beard. Wellington: Open Space Society, 1991.
 ---. Precinct Planning for Wellington 1965. Wellington: Greater Wellington and Hutt Valley Retailers' Assoc., 1965.
 ---. "Principles in redevelopment." New Zealand Architect 4 (1987): 63,69.
 ---. Regional park asunder blunder. OSSMOSIS 24. Ed. James Albert Beard. Wellington: Wellington Heritage And Conservation Trust, 1994.
 ---. "Resource Management jottings." OSSMOSIS 44 (1997): 1–5.
 ---. Resource management, design and planning. OSSMOSIS 14. Ed. James Albert Beard. Wellington: Open Space Society, 1992.
 ---. "Saving old buildings." Evening Post [Wellington] 10 Nov. 1992.
 ---. "Scapes, sustainability and survivals." OSSMOSIS 46 (1999): 1–3.
 ---. Site analysis and appraisals. OSSMOSIS 6. Ed. James Albert Beard. Wellington: Open Space Society, 1990.
 ---. Social concern and the Architectural Centre, Wellington. OSSMOSIS 41. Ed. James Albert Beard. Wellington: New Zealand Heritage and Conservation Trust; Wellington Heritage and Conservation Trust, 1997.
 ---. "Some notes on development and building control." NZIA Journal 4 (1980): 13–19.
 ---. Some notes on the regulatory pitfalls of building conservation. OSSMOSIS 8. Ed. James Albert Beard. Wellington: Open Space Society, 1990.
 ---. Some planning issues. OSSMOSIS 16. Ed. James Albert Beard. Wellington: Open Space Society, 1992.
 ---. "St Jerome's aedicule." OSSMOSIS 64 (2007): 1–8.
 ---. State Highway Two and Kaitoke Regional Park. OSSMOSIS 26. Ed. James Albert Beard. Wellington: Wellington Heritage And Conservation Trust, 1994.
 ---. "Study Paper: Open space and amenity." The future shape of Wellington: a symposium. Victoria University of Wellington: Victoria University of Wellington, 1971.
 ---. "Summary review on conservation progress and NZHPT Annual Review". Feb. 1992. OSSMOSIS 15. Personal collection of J A Beard, Wellington.
 ---. Symbols and National Museums. OSSMOSIS 7. Ed. James Albert Beard. Wellington: Open Space Society, 1990.
 ---. "A theatre to seat 800." Design Review 1.4 (1948): 2–4.
 ---. "Trenchant criticism lauded." The Dominion [Wellington] 20 Sep. 1985.
 ---. "An unbuilt 1980 office block." OSSMOSIS 56 (2005): 1–3.
 ---. "'Vandalism' in wharf changes." Evening Post [Wellington] 19 May 1986.
 ---. "Vernon A Brown." Architectural Centre Inc. Newsletter Apr. (1965).
 ---. The Wellington bypass road and the Waterfront race. OSSMOSIS 20. Ed. James Albert Beard. Wellington: Open Space Society, 1993.
 ---. "Wellington inner city bypass." OSSMOSIS 45 (1998): 1–15.
 ---. The Wellington Motorway Southern Extension – for whom? OSSMOSIS 10. Ed. James Albert Beard. Wellington: Open Space Society, 1991.
 ---. The Wellington Saint James Theatre, chaste, or chaste away. OSSMOSIS 9. Ed. James Albert Beard. Wellington: Open Space Society, 1990.
 ---. The Wellington Town Belt restored. OSSMOSIS 38. Ed. James Albert Beard. Wellington: New Zealand Heritage and Conservation Trust; Wellington Heritage and Conservation Trust, 1996.
 ---. The Wellington Town Hall Conservation – who cares? OSSMOSIS 11. Ed. James Albert Beard. Wellington: Open Space Society, 1991.
 ---. "The Wellington Waterfront – an "ongoing situation"." Home and Building February/March (1984): 71, 73.
 ---. "Wellingtons worst buildings." OSSMOSIS 62 (2007): 1–3.
 ---. Westport Chambers, saved or oil slicked? OSSMOSIS 12. Ed. James Albert Beard. Wellington: Open Space Society, 1991.
 Beard, James Albert, and Sandy Beath. "A bit o'culture or a better cup of coffee." Home and Building August/September (1983): 25.
 Bonny, Stephanie, and Marilyn Reynolds. Living with 50 Architects: A New Zealand Perspective. Auckland: Cassell, 1980.
 Clark, Justine, and Paul Walker. Looking for the Local: Architecture and the New Zealand Modern. Wellington: VUP, 2000.
 Dudding, Michael. A Final Formality: Three Modernist Pavilion Houses of the Early 1960s. "...about as austere as a Dior gown...": New Zealand architecture the 1960s: a one day symposium. Ed. Christine McCarthy. Wellington: VUW, 2005. 7–11.
 ---. "A Useful Exercise: The context, content, and practical application of W H Alington’s ‘ Thesis on the Theory of Architectural Design'." Thesis. VUW, 2005.
 ---. "My Favourite Modernist Building: PSA Tower." Arch Centre 21.Aug 2016
 ---. W H Alington Oral History Project. Wellington: Oral History Centre, ATL, 2007.
 Gabites and Beard. Precinct Planning for Wellington 1965. Wellington: Greater Wellington and Hutt Valley Retailers Association, 1965.
 Gatley, Julia. "'The Project': Town Planning in Wellington to 1972." 5th Australian Urban History/Planning History Conference. Adelaide: University of South Australia, 2000.
 ---. "The Wellington CBD Replanned: Wgtn 196X." "...about as austere as a Dior gown...": New Zealand architecture the 1960s: a one day symposium. Ed. Christine McCarthy. Wellington: VUW, 2005. 17–25.
 Grondelle, Carole van. "BNZ site solution hope." Dominion [Wellington] 8 Oct. 1986.
 Hannah, Dorita. "Architecture as Stage." Exquisite Apart: 100 Years of Architecture in New Zealand. Ed. Charles Walker. Auckland: Balasoglou Books, 2005. 182–93.
 Hodgson, Terence. Looking at the Architecture of New Zealand. Wellington: Grantham House, 1990.
 James Beard and Company. Hannah Playhouse Wellington. Wellington: Hannah Playhouse Trust, 1970.
 Jenkins, Douglas Lloyd, and Bill McKay. "Top 50 homes of the century." New Zealand Home and Entertaining Dec. 1999/Jan. 2000 (1999): 64–86.
 Jones, Michael. "Professional Recognition: James Beard." Landscape New Zealand. Sep./Oct.(1998): 9–11.
 Kernohan, David. Wellington's New Buildings: A Photographic Guide to New Buildings in Central Wellington. Wellington: VUP, 1989.
 Lochhead, Ian. "Unbuilt Sixties: The Unsuccessful Entries in the Christchurch Town Hall Competition." "...about as austere as a Dior gown...": New Zealand architecture the 1960s: a one day symposium. Ed. Christine McCarthy. Wellington: VUW, 2005. 42–47.
 McCarthy, Christine. "High Modern." Architecture New Zealand. Mar./Apr.(2006): 65–69.
 Mercer, Geoff. "Greens back 'grey' plan." Evening Post [Wellington] 5 Oct. 1992.
 ---. "Greens recycle motorway plan." Evening Post [Wellington] 3 Oct. 1992: 1.
 Murphy, Lyn. "Centre Keeps Watch on Capital." Evening Post [Wellington]. 20 Aug. 1991: 15.
 Rizos, Chritinea. "Architecture for the people." City Voice [Wellington] 13 Feb. 1997.
 Sparrow, Brendon. "Post Office history detailed." Motueka & Golden Bay Times [Motueka] 20 May 1999.
 Staffan, Jan. "Interview with James Beard." Early Architectural Centre Oral History Project. Wellington: Oral History Centre, ATL, 2001.
 Walker, Charles, ed. Exquisite Apart: 100 Years of Architecture in New Zealand. Auckland: Balasoglou Books, 2005.

References

External links
A Theatre to seat 800 (etext of 1948 article)

1924 births
2017 deaths
People from Christchurch
New Zealand architects
New Zealand landscape architects
Conservation architects
New Zealand urban planners
Fellows of the New Zealand Institute of Architects
MIT School of Architecture and Planning alumni
Harvard Graduate School of Design alumni
University of Auckland alumni